The siege of Jaén was one of many sieges on that city during the Spanish Reconquista. The siege was carried out from 24 June through September, 1230 by forces of the Kingdom of Castile commanded by Ferdinand III of Castile against the defending Taifa of Jayyān (جيان). The battle resulted in a Jayyānese victory after the Castilian withdrawal and abandonment of the siege immediately following the death of King Alfonso IX of León.

Context 

In 1229, Ferdinand III of Castile resumed his military campaigns against his Moorish neighbors that had been ongoing since 1224. In 1225, a previous attempt to capture the city resulted in failure when the combined forces of the Kingdom of Castile and the Taifa of Baeza withdrew due to a lack of proper siege equipment before the city's formidable defenses. In 1229, Ferdinand III commenced hostilities in the area around Jaén, taking the castle at Otíñar (which was a point of immense strategic significance if a siege of the city was to be undertaken) and pillaging the areas surrounding the city. Throughout 1229, Ferdinand III continued actions on the areas surrounding Jaén for his eventual siege, capturing strongpoints and preparing for his siege the following year.

The siege 

On 24 June, Ferdinand III of Castile who was by this time the King of Castile, commenced the formal siege on the city of Jaén with a determination to capture the city that had withstood his previous siege attempt five years previously. The siege of 1230 presented a greater challenge than the one in 1225 because the city defenses had been significantly improved by the ruling Taifa of Jayyān as they had expected further Castilian aggression. As a result, Ferdinand III required a much larger army to mount a definitive and decisive blow to the city.

According to the Chronicle of Ávila, the knights of Ávila, who formed a portion of the Castilian assault force, were positioned on the Cerro del Neveral (en: Neveral Hill) which was located directly in front of the castle walls. Their placement in this location was an apparent punishment for having arrived late to the city's previous siege five years before indicating an unforgiving temperament on the part of Ferdinand III. From this position, the knights of Ávila were harassed by the city's trebuchet defenses.

By September, after a siege of around four months, Ferdinand III was obliged to withdraw prematurely a second time from his siege of the city, this time due to the death of his father, Alfonso IX of León. He ordered the siege lifted and traveled to Orgaz to join his mother, Berengaria of Castile. The two then proceeded together to León where Ferdinand III, already King of Castile was to be crowned also as the King of León and of Galacia.

Consequences 

The city of Jaén remained an independent Taifa for some time after the battle, eventually being incorporated into the Emirate of Granada. Jaén would finally be permanently taken by Castilian forces in 1246 when the forces of Castile and members of the Order of Santiago under Ferdinand III of Castile and Paio Peres Correia, Grand Master of the Order of Santiago, returned to finish the capture of the defiant city, defeating a Granadan army under Muhammad I.

See also 

 Jaén, Spain
 List of Castilian Battles
 Ferdinand III of Castile

References

Bibliography 

 

 

 

 

Conflicts in 1230
Jaen (1230)
Jaen 1230
Jaen
Jaen 1230
1230 in Europe
13th century in Al-Andalus
Jaén, Spain
13th century in Castile